

Wulfhun was a Bishop of Selsey (in modern-day England) during the 10th century.

In 931 Wulfhun witnessed a charter of King Athelstan, although his see is not mentioned.

According to Kelly, Wulfhun continued to attest until 940, but was no longer in office by 943. It is therefore assumed that Wulfhun died between 940 and 943.

Citations

References

Further reading

External links
 

10th-century English bishops
Bishops of Selsey